Sir Richard Fowler, 2nd Baronet (1681–1731), of Harnage Grange, Shropshire was an English politician.

Life
He was the eldest son of  Sir William Fowler, 1st Baronet and his wife Mary Cotton, daughter of Sir Robert Cotton, 1st Baronet, of Combermere.

Fowler was a Member (MP) of the Parliament of Great Britain for Radnorshire, from 1715 to 1722.

Family
Fowler married Sarah Sloane, daughter of William Sloane and niece of Sir Hans Sloane. They had two sons and a daughter:

Sir William Fowler, 3rd Baronet (1718–1746)
Sir Hans Fowler, 5th Baronet (died 1773), last of the Fowler baronets of Harnage Grange.
Sarah Fowler (died 1799), married Col. Hodges (John Hodges of Brook Street, died 1768), grandmother through her daughter Sarah, who married George Hastings, of Hans Francis Hastings, 12th Earl of Huntingdon. Her son and co-heir Thomas Hodges changed his surname to Fowler.

References

1681 births
1731 deaths
Politicians from Shropshire
Baronets in the Baronetage of England
British MPs 1715–1722
Members of the Parliament of Great Britain for Welsh constituencies